Uroporphyrinogen III decarboxylase (uroporphyrinogen decarboxylase, or UROD) is an enzyme that in humans is encoded by the UROD  gene.

Function 

Uroporphyrinogen III decarboxylase is a homodimeric enzyme that catalyzes the fifth step in heme biosynthesis, which corresponds to the elimination of carboxyl groups from the four acetate side chains of uroporphyrinogen III to yield coproporphyrinogen III:
uroporphyrinogen III  coproporphyrinogen III + 4 CO2

Clinical significance 

Mutations and deficiency in this enzyme are known to cause familial porphyria cutanea tarda and hepatoerythropoietic porphyria. At least 65 disease-causing mutations in this gene have been discovered.

Mechanism 

At low substrate concentrations, the reaction is believed to follow an ordered route, with the sequential removal of CO2 from the D, A, B, and C rings, whereas at higher substrate/enzyme levels a random route seems to be operative. The enzyme functions as a dimer in solution, and both the enzymes from human and tobacco have been crystallized and solved at good resolutions.

UroD is regarded as an unusual decarboxylase, since it performs decarboxylations without the intervention of any cofactors, unlike the vast majority of decarboxylases. Its mechanism has recently been proposed to proceed through substrate protonation by an arginine residue. A 2008 report demonstrated that the uncatalyzed rate for UroD's reaction is 10−19 s−1, so at pH 10 the rate acceleration of UroD relative to the uncatalyzed rate, i.e. catalytic proficiency, is the largest for any enzyme known, 6 x 1024 M−1.

References

Further reading

External links 
 

EC 4.1.1